James Beatty (April 27, 1817 – January 3, 1892) was a merchant, pioneer, farmer, trader, hotel owner, and territorial legislator.

Born in Fairfield County, Ohio, Beatty moved to Cass County, Michigan Territory, in 1831. He moved to Fort Atkinson, Iowa , In 1848, Beatty moved to Sauk Rapids, Wisconsin Territory. He was a trader, farmer, merchant, and hotel owner. In 1852 and 1855, Beatty served in the Minnesota Territorial House of Representatives. Beatty died in Sauk Rapids, Minnesota.

References

External links
Beatty, Dempster marriages and Children

1817 births
1892 deaths
People from Fairfield County, Ohio
People from Sauk Rapids, Minnesota
Businesspeople from Minnesota
Farmers from Minnesota
Members of the Minnesota Territorial Legislature
19th-century American politicians